SJB Institute of Technology (SJBIT) is a private engineering college in Bangalore which was established in the year 2001. The college is located near Kengeri and 14 km from Majestic. SJBIT is affiliated to Visvesvaraya Technological University, Belagavi and approved by AICTE, New Delhi.

The institution offers 4 year full-time undergraduate degree courses, 2 year full-time PG courses and Research Centre for Doctorate degree courses in CSE, ECE, ISE, Civil, Mechanical, Mathematics & Physics department.

SJB Research Foundation

SJB Research Foundation (SJBRF) is a Section 25 non-profit company has been launched in the campus. It is a sponsored research center to bridge the gap between academic and industrial research.

Center of Excellence for Training and Research in Automation Technologies

SJBIT is recognized by few as "Center of Excellence for Training and Research in Automation Technologies". SJBIT in association with BOSCH REXORTH India Ltd. offers certification courses (Industrial Oriented Training Programs) in PLC, Sensorics, Drives and Controls, Hydraulics and Pneumatics.

Departments and Programmes
UG Courses Offered 
 Computer Science and Engineering.
 Information Science and Engineering.
 Electronics and Communication Engineering.
 Electrical and Electronics Engineering.
 Mechanical Engineering.
 Civil Engineering.
 Artificial Intelligence Machine Learning 
 Computer Science & Engineering (Data Science)

PG Courses Offered:
 Masters in Business Administration 
 M.Tech in Computer Aided Design of Structures 
 M.Tech in Structural Engineering

References

External links

Engineering colleges in Bangalore